Idol of Paris is a 1948 film based on the novel Paiva, Queen of Love by Alfred Schirokauer, about a mid-19th century French courtesan Theresa who sleeps her way from poverty to the top of Second Empire society. It was an attempt by its makers to imitate the success of the Gainsborough melodramas.

Plot
In the 1860s, a woman rises from poverty to become the toast of Paris.

Cast
Beryl Baxter – Theresa
Michael Rennie – Hertz, one of Theresa's lovers
Christine Norden – Cora Pearl 
Miles Malleson – Offenbach
Andrew Osborn – Antoine 
Andrew Cruickshank – Prince Nicholas 
Kenneth Kent – Emperor Napoleon 
Margaretta Scott – Empress Eugenie 
Patti Morgan – Bellanger 
Genine Graham – Barucci 
Henry Oscar – Lachman 
Sybille Binder – Mrs. Lachman 
Leslie Perrins – Count Paiva 
Campbell Cotts – George Tremer Sr. 
John Penrose – George Cremer Jr.
April Stride as Countess de Molney
Donald Gray as Police Inspector
June Holden as Marie
Frederick Bradshaw as Chamberlain
Marianne Stone as Theresa's Secretary

Production
The film was produced by Maurice Ostrer who moved into independent production after leaving Gainsborough Pictures. He set up his own company, Premier Productions, and made the film in association with R. J. Minney and Leslie Arliss who had all collaborated on The Wicked Lady.

Filing started in August 1947. It was shot at MGM's British studios.

The cast includes Australian Patti Morgan, who Ostrer put under a seven-year contract.

Reception

Critical
Reviews were very bad.

The Monthly Film Bulletin wrote that "the film is over-exaggerated in every detail and will appeal only to the very unsophisticated."

Variety said Ostrer "forgot that recent successful mellers leaned on stars for clicks with this 'first independent production. He boasts that the team that made his "Wicked Lady" has turned out this picture, but he has no James Mason and no Margaret Lockwood to carry the burden of an ill- written, corny script., Instead, he has comparative newcomers, who unfortunately do not merit leads in an ambitious picture. Its boxoffice prospects are dim. It would be a waste to export it to America."

Box office
The movie was not a financial success and led to Maurice Ostrer quitting the film business for good. He cancelled plans to make a film Wild Marriage and dropped eight artists who he had under contract.

The careers of Leslie Arliss and Beryl Baxter never recovered either.

References

External links

 
Idol of Paris at Park Circus
Idol of Paris at Letterbox DVD

1948 films
1940s historical films
British historical films
Films directed by Leslie Arliss
British black-and-white films
Films set in France
Films set in the 19th century
Cultural depictions of Napoleon III
Second French Empire
1940s British films